Paget Island is an island of the Andaman Islands. It belongs to the North and Middle Andaman administrative district, part of the Indian union territory of Andaman and Nicobar Islands.

Geography
The island is in the Temple Sound area of North Andaman shores. It is 76 m high to the tops of the trees.

Administration
Politically, Paget Island, along neighboring Temple Sound Islands, is part of Diglipur Tehsil.

References 

 Geological Survey of India

Islands of North and Middle Andaman district